This is a list of films released in the 2000s produced in Armenia or directed by Armenians or about Armenia or Armenians, ordered by year of release.

References

External links
 Armenian film at the Internet Movie Database

2000
Arm
Films